There are Gay men's choruses in many cities, including:

Canada

 Vancouver Men's Chorus

Norway
 Oslo Fagottkor

United Kingdom
 London Gay Men's Chorus
 The Sunday Boys, Manchester

United States
 Atlanta Gay Men's Chorus
Austin Gay Men's Chorus

 Boston Gay Men's Chorus

 Chicago Gay Men's Chorus

 Columbus Gay Men's Chorus
 Connecticut Gay Men's Chorus
Des Moines Gay Men's Chorus

 Heartland Men's Chorus (Kansas City, Missouri)
 Gay Men's Chorus of Los Angeles 
Midlands Men's Chorus: The Gay Men's Chorus of Columbia (South Carolina)
 New Hampshire Gay Men's Chorus
 New Orleans Gay Men's Chorus
 New York City Gay Men's Chorus
 Oakland Gay Men's Chorus
 Out Loud Colorado Springs Men's Chorus
 Perfect Harmony Men's Chorus of Madison (Wisconsin)
 Philadelphia Gay Men's Chorus
 Phoenix Metropolitan Men's Chorus
 Pioneer Valley Gay Men's Chorus
 Portland Gay Men's Chorus
 San Diego Men's Chorus
 Gay Men's Chorus of San Diego
 San Francisco Gay Men's Chorus
 Seattle Men's Chorus
 Silicon Valley Gay Men's Chorus
 Turtle Creek Chorale
 Twin Cities Gay Men's Chorus
 Gay Men's Chorus of Washington, D.C.

 
Gay culture
Homosexuality-related lists